Hashjin(also Romanized as Hashjin; also known as Heshajeyn, Heshajīn, Heshīīn, Hīshen, Shain, and Shein) is a city in Khvoresh Rostam District, Khalkhal County, Ardabil Province, Iran. At the 2006 census, its population was 4,518 in 1,199 households. The following census in 2011 counted 4,578 people in 1,309 households. The latest census in 2016 showed a population of 5,725 people in 1,775 households. It is located east of the Qizil Üzan river, in the Alborz (Elburz) mountain range. Sheikh Hekmatollah Ramezani is the imam of Sheikh Mohammad Ghoreyshi mosque.

Tageo

References 

Khalkhal County

Cities in Ardabil Province

 Towns and villages in Khalkhal County

Populated places in Ardabil Province

Populated places in Khalkhal County

Settled areas of Elburz